Lloyd Ashley Ellams (born 11 January 1991) is an English footballer who plays as a striker.

Career

Early career
Born in Chester, Cheshire, Ellams was member of Chester City's youth system. He gained experience with a loan spell at Conference North team Droylsden early in the 2008–09 season. His debut in the Football League followed as a late substitute for Richie Partridge in Chester's 2–0 home loss to Rochdale on 3 February 2009. After a further substitute appearance at Shrewsbury Town in February, Ellams was handed his first start in the penultimate match of the season at Aldershot Town. He won Chester an early penalty and then scored his first goal for the club later in the match, making him the last player to score for Chester in the football league, the 2–2 draw effectively relegated City. After the club's demise in 2010, Ellams signed for Northern Premier League side Marine.

Stalybridge Celtic
He signed for Conference North side Stalybridge Celtic prior to the 2010–11 season, making his debut for the club on 14 August 2010 in a 2–0 win over Redditch United. Ellams scored his first goal for the club on 28 September 2010 in extra time of an FA Cup tie against Alfreton Town. He scored his first league goal for the club on 6 November 2010 in a 5–0 win over Workington in which his strike partner, Phil Marsh, scored the other four goals. He agreed a new contract at the club in June 2010 which would keep him at the Tameside club until the end of the 2011–12 season.

References

External links

1991 births
Living people
Sportspeople from Chester
English footballers
Association football forwards
Chester City F.C. players
Droylsden F.C. players
English Football League players
National League (English football) players
Marine F.C. players
Stalybridge Celtic F.C. players
Conwy Borough F.C. players
Vauxhall Motors F.C. players